DLR Band is the fifth full-length studio album by David Lee Roth, the former vocalist of Van Halen, and the first and only credited to the DLR Band. It was released in 1998 and remains the only installment on Roth's own Wawazat!! label.

Information
DLR Band was recorded and mixed in ten days, a technique Roth had not utilized since 1979's Van Halen II. John Lowery (aka John 5), Mike Hartman, and Terry Kilgore played guitar on the record. Lowery actually performed double duty for the record, performing bass guitar under the "B'ourbon Bob" pseudonym. Also on the album was a then virtually unknown drummer Ray Luzier, later a full member of Korn.

Two tracks from DLR Band, "King of the Hill" and "Indeedido", would later appear on Mike Hartman's solo release, Black Glue, as "Southern Romp" and "Stomp", respectively. Written by Hartman, both tracks would be remixed and made instrumental for Hartman's release.

The album's cover artwork features a picture of model Bettie Page taken by Bunny Yeager, who receives credit in the liner notes. This led to it being colloquially referred to as the Bettie Page album.

DLR Band debuted at #172 on the charts with 8,000 copies sold in the first week. Within a year the album had sold 65,000 copies.

Track listing

Personnel
David Lee Roth - harmonica (track 2), vocals, cover art concept
Ray Luzier - drums
John Lowery - guitar (tracks 1 - 3, 5, 8, 9, 13) & bass (tracks 1-10, 12 & 13)
Terry Kilgore - guitar (tracks 4, 7, 11, 12, 14), synthesizer (track 14)
Mike Hartman - guitar (tracks 6, 10)
Tom Lilly - bass (tracks 11, 14)

 Production
Bob Marlette - producer
EA Management - Eddie Anderson
Jeffrey Thomas - assistant engineer
Erich Gobel - assistant engineer
DeVal Day - assistant engineer
Kendall Johnson - art direction, design
Kieren McClelland - mastering
Michael Migliozzi - art direction, design
Erwin Musper - engineer, mastering, mixing
Bunny Yeager - photography

References

David Lee Roth albums
1998 albums
Albums produced by Bob Marlette